Hyalobarrier is a substance to keep tissue apart post surgery and therefore prevent adhesions. It contains autocross-linked hyaluronan. Highly viscous due to condensation. Hyaluronan is present in cartilage and skin hence there is a natural metabolic pathway for it. This gel is used to separate organs and tissue after surgery. 
Scientific documentation so far covers the gynaecology speciality. IE Laparoscopic surgery, hysteroscopy/hysteroscopic surgery but also open surgery.
According to data in a Cochrane collaboration review barrier agents may be a little more effective in preventing adhesions than no intervention. The Cochrane report also states that the incidence of postsurgical adhesions is as high as 50 to 100%.
In a recent review by C Sutton (University of Surrey, Guilford UK), it is stated that Hyalobarrier is the only anti adhesive substance that has published data for intrauterine use.

Additional information 
 Laparoscopy
 Asherman's syndrome

References 

Biomaterials
Implants (medicine)
Medical equipment